This is a list of diplomatic missions of Tajikistan, excluding honorary consulates.  Tajikistan is a landlocked Central Asian country.

Africa

 Cairo (Embassy)

America

 Washington, D.C. (Embassy)

Asia

 Kabul (Embassy)
 Mazar-e Sharif (Consulate)
 Fayzabad (Consulate)

 Baku (Embassy)

 Beijing (Embassy)

 New Delhi (Embassy)

 Tehran (Embassy)

 Tokyo (Embassy)

 Astana (Embassy)
 Almaty (Consulate-General)

 Kuwait City (Embassy)

 Bishkek (Embassy)

 Kuala Lumpur (Embassy)

 Islamabad (Embassy)

 Doha (Embassy)

 Riyadh (Embassy)

 Seoul (Embassy)

 Ankara (Embassy)
 Istanbul (Consulate-General)

 Ashgabat (Embassy)

 Abu Dhabi (Embassy)

 Tashkent (Embassy)

Europe

 Vienna (Embassy)

 Minsk (Embassy)

 Brussels (Embassy)

 Paris (Embassy)

 Berlin (Embassy)

 Moscow (Embassy)
 Saint Petersburg (Consulate-General)
 Novosibirsk (Consulate-General)
 Yekaterinburg (Consulate-General)
 Ufa (Consulate-General)

 Geneva (Embassy)
 
 Kyiv (Embassy)

 London (Embassy)

Embassy to open

Multilateral organisations

 New York City (Permanent Mission to the United Nations)

Gallery

See also

 Foreign relations of Tajikistan
 List of diplomatic missions in Tajikistan

References
Ministry of Foreign Affairs of Tajikistan

 
Tajikistan
Diplomatic missions